Māris Ziediņš (born March 3, 1990) is a Latvian professional basketball player from Strenči, Latvia, who currently plays for  BC Tallinna Kalev in the top tier Latvian–Estonian Basketball League

References

External links
Profile at RealGM

1990 births
Living people
BK Valmiera players
Latvian men's basketball players
Rapla KK players
Traiskirchen Lions players
Latvian expatriate basketball people in Estonia